Yengejeh Rural District is in Howmeh District of Azarshahr County, East Azerbaijan province, Iran. At the census of 2006, its population was 6,264 in 1,553 households; there were 6,567 inhabitants in 1,890 households at the following census of 2011; and in the most recent census of 2016, the population of the rural district was 6,785 in 2,058 households. The largest of its 10 villages was Khanamir, with 2,381 people.

References 

Azarshahr County

Rural Districts of East Azerbaijan Province

Populated places in East Azerbaijan Province

Populated places in Azarshahr County